Purochana is a character in Hindu mythology, an architect in the kingdom of Hastinapura, and one of Duryodhana's trusted aides in the Indian epic Mahabharata. He was also a minister under the Kauravas.

He is better known as the individual who created the Lakshagraha (palace of lac) under the orders of Duryodhana and his evil mentor, Shakuni. Purochana himself perished in the fire meant to kill the Pandavas. In his previous life, he had been born as Prahasta, who was a powerful rakshasa warrior, and chief commander of Ravana's army of Lanka. In both his births, he has been the minister of antagonistic monarchs.

References

Characters in the Mahabharata